A Higher Calling: Inside America’s Airline Maintenance Mecca is a proposed American documentary series in production as of 2020. The docuseries follows MRO (Maintenance, repair and overhaul) workers in the nation’s largest MRO facility in Tulsa, Oklahoma, going inside the often overlooked world of air cargo operations.

Premise
MRO became a prominent industry in Tulsa, Oklahoma when American Airlines relocated its Tech Ops headquarters from New York’s LaGuardia Airport to Tulsa in 1946. Since then, commercial MRO facilities at Tulsa International Airport (TUL) have become the largest in the world, including 3.3 million square feet of hangar and shop space sitting on 330 acres. On average, more than 900 aircraft visit the facility in Tulsa each year, which accounts for 1 out of every 10 commercial US aircraft. Tulsa has earned the nickname the ‘Airline Maintenance Mecca’ because of its over 50,000 person workforce.

A Higher Calling dives into the world of cargo airplane repair, following the lives of veteran MRO mechanics, facility managers, and first-year engineers who do the high-stakes, behind-the-scenes work often taken for granted in shipping, delivery, and commercial air travel.

Production
Filming for the series began in December 2020 and wrapped in May 2021. The documentary series is expected to premiere via Amazon Prime Video in the near future.

References

2020s American documentary television series
Amazon Prime Video original programming
Documentary television series about aviation
Documentary television series about industry
English-language television shows
Television shows set in Tulsa, Oklahoma
Television series by Amazon Studios
Upcoming television series